North Country  is the original soundtrack album, on the Columbia/Sony Music Sountrax label, of the 2005 film North Country starring Charlize Theron, Frances McDormand and Woody Harrelson. The original score and songs were composed and produced by Gustavo Santaolalla.

Track listing
  "North Country"  Gustavo Santaolalla  2:07 
  "Girl from the North Country"  Leo Kottke  3:34 
  "Tell Ol' Bill"  Bob Dylan  5:08 
  "Werewolves of London"  Warren Zevon  3:28 
  "Bette Davis Eyes"  Kim Carnes  3:49 
  "If I Said You Had a Beautiful Body Would You Hold It Against Me"  Bellamy Brothers  3:17 
  "Lay Lady Lay"  Bob Dylan  3:19 
  "A Saturday in My Classroom"  Gustavo Santaolalla  3:48 
  "Sweetheart Like You"  Bob Dylan  4:35 
 "Baby, Don't Get Hooked on Me"  Mac Davis  3:05 
 "Do Right to Me Baby (Do Unto Others)"  Bob Dylan  3:52 
 "Standing Up"  Gustavo Santaolalla  2:43 
 "Paths of Victory"  Cat Power  3:22 

Drama film soundtracks
2005 soundtrack albums
Albums produced by Gustavo Santaolalla
Columbia Records soundtracks